Wherever We Are may refer to:

"Wherever We Are", song by Human Life
"Wherever We Are", song by Oliver from Full Circle
"Wherever We Are", song from the musical Come from Away